The Nerobergbahn is a funicular railway in Wiesbaden, Germany. The line links the city, with a station at the north of the Nerotalanlagen, with the Neroberg hill to its north, which offers a panorama view.

History 
The line opened in 1888, and is one of the few funiculars employing water propulsion. When the downhill carriage arrives at the lower station, the water is discharged and pumped uphill.

In 1939, it was planned to convert the line to electric propulsion and to provide larger cars, but the outbreak of World War II prevented this. The line was taken out of service in 1944 due to war damage, and service was restarted in 1948. In 1988 the line was protected as a technical monument by the State of Hesse.

Specifications
The funicular has the following technical parameters:
Maximum gradient: 26%
Average gradient: 19%
Journey time: 3.5 minutes
Traction: Water ballast

Gallery

See also 
 List of funicular railways

References

Bibliography

External links 

 (in English)

Transport in Wiesbaden
Railway lines in Hesse
Water-powered funicular railways
Funicular railways in Germany
Metre gauge railways in Germany
Tourist attractions in Wiesbaden
Railway lines opened in 1888